Edis, EDIS or Ediz may also refer to:

 Edis (name)
 Electronic Distributorless Ignition System
 Ford EDIS
 Emergency Disaster Information Service, a global natural disaster tracking service in Hungary
 Emergency Digital Information Service, a public information system run by the State of California
 Emily Dickinson International Society, society to study the American poet
 Environmental Data and Information Service
 European Deposit Insurance Scheme, proposed part of the Economic and Monetary Union of the European Union

See also 
 Edisa, a settlement in South Ossetia, Georgia